Mahra may refer to:

Middle East
 Al Mahrah Governorate, a governorate in Yemen
 Mahra Sultanate, a historical sultanate in South Arabia
 Mehri people, an ethnic group of Oman and Yemen
 Mehri language, the Modern South Arabian language spoken by them

South Asia
 Mahra, Khyber Pakhtunkhwa, a town in Pakistan
 Mahendra Singh Mahra (born 1937), Indian MP
 Ummed Singh Mahra (1942–1971), Indian soldier

See also 
 Marha (disambiguation)
 Marah (disambiguation)

Language and nationality disambiguation pages